Ali Baba 40 Dongalu is a 1970 Telugu-language fantasy swashbuckler film directed by B. Vittalacharya. It stars N. T. Rama Rao and Jayalalithaa, with music composed by Ghantasala. The film is produced by N. Ramabrahmam under the Sri Gowtham Pictures banner. The film is based on a story from Arabian Nights called Ali Baba and the Forty Thieves.

Plot
The film begins with 40 thieves making huge robberies at various places of Baghdad and hiding their stolen treasure at a secret cave called Sesame. Once their Sardar  sends his acolyte Choto  with his daughter Marjiana to find out the wealthy people in the city. Alibaba is a young & energetic guy, sees the dance performance of Marjiana, develops an acquaintance with her and both of them fall in love. Alibaba & his mother Chandbibi  lives along with his elder brother Kasim Khan  a rich person but a huge miser and similarly, his wife Sultana is a shrew. They separate Alibaba and gives two donkeys for his livelihood, so, he decides to bring wood from the forest. Once Alibaba is cutting wood he observes the head of the thieves chanting some words of a cave door opens and when they come out and he chants some other words. Alibaba secretly enters into the cave, notices a lot of treasure, collects it and comes back. Now Alibaba becomes one of the richest person of Baghdad. Kasim Khan feels jealous about his brother's wealth, he silently knows regarding the secret treasure, reaches the cave and becomes flabbergasted. By the time, thieves arrive and catch him and learn his brother also knows this place. So, they take him to their fort and starts torturing him. Understanding the situation, Alibaba immediately rushes to the cave and finds out the route to the fort. But he also caught when Marjiana helps them to escape. Knowing it, Angered, Chotu tries to kill Marjiana but Sardar obstructs his way and dies. Alibaba brings his brother back, due to fear of the thieves he secretly brings the village doctor by blindfolding and keeping his brother in a dark room. After the treatment, while leaving, the clever doctor keeps a mark on the door. After that, Alibaba again goes to the thieves fort saves Marjiana and brings her home. Meanwhile, Kasim recovers, realize his mistake and says sorry to Alibaba. Parallelly, Chotu secretly meets the doctor and asks him to reveal whom he recently cured of deadly wounds. So, he shows the house which he has marked, but Marjiana observes it and cleverly makes the same mark on every house. Now Chotu decides to burn the entire village when Alibaba motivates the villagers to safeguard the village from 4 sides. So, Chotu makes a ploy, enters the village as an oil merchant along with 39 oil barrels in which the remaining thieves are hidden. Alibaba gives him a warm welcome when, fortunately, the oil is nill in their kitchen. So, Marjiana goes to collect some oil from the barrels where she finds out that the thieves are hidden in it. Now Alibaba makes a plan, secretly burns all the barrels. Angered Chotu captures Marjiana and runs away to the cave, Alibaba follows him and stamps out Chotu. At last, Alibaba distributes the entire treasure in the cave to the villagers. Finally, the movie ends on a happy note with the marriage of Alibaba & Marjiana.

Cast

Soundtrack

Music composed by Ghantasala.

References

External links

1970 films
Indian swashbuckler films
Films based on Indian folklore
Films scored by Ghantasala (musician)
Indian fantasy adventure films
1970s fantasy adventure films
Films based on Ali Baba
1970s Telugu-language films